Dalonghua Township is a township under the administration of Yi County, Hebei, China. , it has 18 villages under its administration.

References 

Township-level divisions of Hebei
Yi County, Hebei